Hulun may refer to:

Hulun (alliance), historical alliance of Jurchen tribes
Hulun Buir, city in Inner Mongolia, China
Lake Hulun, lake in Inner Mongolia, China